Texas State Highway 130 (SH 130), also known as the Pickle Parkway, is a highway from Interstate 35 (I-35) in San Antonio along I-410 and I-10 to east of Seguin, then north as tollway from there to I-35 north of Georgetown. SH 130 runs in a  corridor east and south of Austin. The route parallels I-35 and is intended to relieve the Interstate's traffic volume through the San Antonio–Austin corridor by serving as an alternate route.

The highway was developed in response to the tremendous surge in truck traffic on the I-35 corridor brought on by the North American Free Trade Agreement during the late 1990s, especially truck traffic originating from Laredo, where the Texas Department of Transportation (TxDOT) reported 150 trucks entering the United States every hour. A proponent of the highway's development, Capital Area Transportation Coalition, said that congestion along the I-35 corridor is costing businesses more than $194 million a year in higher operating costs and lost productivity.

As of September 2012, the only speed limits in the world higher than this are the  limits of Poland, Bulgaria and Abu Dhabi, though some jurisdictions like Germany and Isle of Man have roads without any posted maximum limit.

Route description
SH 130 begins while running concurrently with I-410 at an interchange with I-35 in southwestern San Antonio. SH 130 follows I-410 until an interchange with I-10/US 90 just east of Downtown San Antonio, and then follows those two highways to Seguin. SH 130 leaves I-10 in eastern Seguin, running north as a tollway. Near Lockhart, the tollway begins an overlap with US 183; US 183 runs along the frontage roads. In the small community of Mustang Ridge, US 183 leaves the frontage roads and an overlap with SH 45 begins. The two highways run in a northeast direction passing through rural areas of Travis County. The tollway passes near Austin-Bergstrom International Airport at the interchange with SH 71 and runs in extreme east Austin. The tollway curves around Lake Walter E. Long after the interchange with the Manor Expressway near Manor. In the city of Pflugerville, there is slight development along the route near Farm to Market Road 685 (FM 685). SH 45 leaves the tollway in Pflugerville, and SH 130 runs through rural areas of Williamson County. SH 130 runs in a slight northwest direction before ending at I-35 in northern Georgetown.

History

Previous route

SH 130 was originally designated in far west Texas, between the city of El Paso and SH 54 in El Paso, Hudspeth, and Culberson counties. That route was designated on January 18, 1928. In 1932, the route was co-designated as a portion of US 62. On January 21, 1936, SH 130 was extended east to the New Mexico state line, replacing a portion of SH 54. The SH 130 designation was dropped with the general re-description of the state highway system on September 26, 1939. Since September 6, 1943, the previous route has also been designated as a portion of US 180 along with US 62.

Current route

SH 130 was designated on May 22, 1985, along with SH 45, as a route from I-35 to US 183 south of Austin. On January 30, 1989, SH 297 was designated from US 183 in Mendoza to I-10 in Seguin. On December 8, 1993, SH 297 became part of SH 130. On October 27, 1994, the SH 130 sections were connected with part of the SH 130 tollway along US 183 added to the plans.

In June 2002, Lone Star Infrastructure, a consortium of major highway construction contractors and civil engineering firms, was awarded a Comprehensive Development Agreement by TxDOT to design and build the section from I-35 in Georgetown to US 183 southeast of Austin. The cost of this section was expected to be $1.5 billion, which included the costs of utility relocation, design, construction, and right-of-way. Right-of-way costs alone were estimated at $389 million.

Groundbreaking for SH 130 took place on October 3, 2003. The first segment to open to the public was from US 290 northbound to US 79 on November 1, 2006. On December 13, the highway was extended northward to a junction with I-35. On September 6, 2007, the route was extended southward from US 290 to SH 71. Segment 4 opened on April 30, 2008, running  from SH 71 to US 183.

On June 28, 2006, a partnership between Cintra and Zachry American Infrastructure, developers of the Trans-Texas Corridor, reached a $1.3 billion agreement with the state to build segments 5 and 6 from US 183 southeast of Austin to I-10 in Seguin. Cintra-Zachry formed SH 130 Concession Company to manage the project. In exchange for the investment, the company received the right to collect tolls for 50 years in a revenue-sharing agreement with the state. The state owns the road while the company is responsible for financing, design, construction, operation, and maintenance over the life of the agreement. Although substantially a private sector project, some costs for segments 5 and 6 were borne by TxDOT, including about 400 highway signs promoting SH 130 as an alternate route and a subsidized toll rate for truckers to use the highway instead of I-35. In 2013, Moody's downgraded the company's debt to junk status due to low traffic revenues, raising the possibility that TxDOT might terminate its toll contract with the group. The company explored debt restructuring around December 2013, and was in danger of a payment default in June 2014, eventually filing for bankruptcy in March 2016. The Concession Company eventually exited bankruptcy in 2017 with a new owner in the form of investment firm Strategic Value Partners, who bought out Cintra's stake in the joint venture.

The 2007 session of the Texas Legislature passed HB 2296, designating SH 130 in Williamson, Travis, Caldwell, and Guadalupe counties as the "Pickle Parkway" in honor of former United States Congressman J.J. "Jake" Pickle. Construction began in early 2009 on the final sections of SH 130, from Lockhart through Caldwell and Guadalupe counties to I-10, which opened on October 24, 2012. On the first evening the roadway was open, three cars crashed into packs of wild hogs. US 183 runs parallel to SH 130 from southeast of Austin to Lockhart.

TxDOT announced on September 29, 2011, that the SH 130 designation had been extended westward, along I-10 to I-410, then southward and westward along I-410 to I-35 in southern San Antonio. On March 2, 2016, the SH 130 Concession Company, who operates the toll road between Seguin and Mustang Ridge, filed for Chapter 11 bankruptcy. The concession's CEO, Alfonso Orol, stated that the highway will continue to operate during the bankruptcy proceedings.

Proposal for toll removal
In 2013, House Bill 3682 was filed by state Representative Paul Workman with the goal of removing the tolls on SH 130 and re-designating the highway as an Interstate. The cost was estimated at $3 billion. $1.5 billion would come from the state's rainy day fund, with an equal amount being funded from federal sources.

Exit list

References

External links

State Highway 130 Concession Company, LLC, developers of SH 130 segments 5 and 6.
Anti-130 page (BicycleAustin.info)

1985 establishments in Texas
Freeways in Texas
Interstate 35
130
130
Transportation in Bexar County, Texas
Transportation in Caldwell County, Texas
Transportation in Guadalupe County, Texas
Transportation in San Antonio
Transportation in Travis County, Texas
Transportation in Williamson County, Texas